This is a list of films produced in Argentina in 1950:

External links and references
 Argentine films of 1950 at the Internet Movie Database

1950
Argentine
Films